The Dr. Walter Thomison House is a historic house in Dayton, Tennessee, U.S.. it was built in 1890 for Walter Thomison, a physician, and his wife, Ella Darwin Thomison. It remained in the Thomison family until 1989. It was designed in the Colonial Revival architectural style. It has been listed on the National Register of Historic Places since September 11, 1997.

It has also been known as the Magnolia House Bed and Breakfast.

References

National Register of Historic Places in Rhea County, Tennessee
Colonial Revival architecture in Tennessee
Houses completed in 1890